Events from the year 1527 in art.

Events
 c. May 6 - The engraver Jacopo Caraglio flees to Venice from the Sack of Rome
 Marcantonio Raimondi publishes the second edition of his erotic engravings I Modi in Rome (accompanied by Aretino's Sonetti lussuriosi); like the first they are suppressed by Pope Clement VII
 Pieter Coecke van Aelst enters the Antwerp Guild of painters
 John Browne becomes the first Serjeant Painter at the English Court

Works

 Hans Holbein the Younger – Sir Thomas More
 Lorenzo Lotto – Man with a Golden Paw
 Stanisław Samostrzelnik – Book of hours of Queen Bona Sforza and Prayer book of Krzysztof Szydłowiecki (approximate date decorations completed)
 Lucas van Leyden – The Last Judgement (triptych, Museum De Lakenhal, Leiden, 1526 or 1527)

Births
November 18 - Luca Cambiasi, Italian painter (died 1585)
date unknown
Michelangelo Aliprandi, Italian painter, pupil of Veronese (died 1595)
Giuseppe Arcimboldo, Italian painter (died 1593)
probable
Pellegrino Tibaldi, Italian mannerist architect, sculptor, and mural painter (died 1596)
Alexander Colyn (born 1527/1529), Flemish sculptor (died 1612)

Deaths
May - Cristoforo Solari, Italian sculptor and architect (born 1460)
June 28 - Bernardo de' Rossi, Italian bishop and patron of the arts (born 1468)
date unknown
Lorenzo Allegri, Italian painter (born unknown)
Raffaellino del Garbo, Florentine painter of the early-Renaissance (born c. 1466)
Cornelis Engebrechtsz., Dutch painter, the first notable painter from Leiden (born 1462)
Cristoforo Foppa, Italian goldsmith, sculptor, and die sinker (born 1445)
Jan Mertens the Younger, South Netherlandish painter (born unknown)
Domenico Puligo, painter from Florence (born 1492)
Jan van Dornicke, South Netherlandish painter (born 1470)
Jan Wellens de Cock, Flemish painter and draughtsman of the Northern Renaissance (born 1480)

References

 
Years of the 16th century in art